Smoke&Mirrors is the first release by German band The Petty Thefts.

Track listing

Personnel
Victor Gerstner - violin
Jonas Dorn - trumpet

References

External links
 The Petty Thefts Official Page
 Klangbad Records

2009 debut albums